Sam Cranage is a former Australian rules footballer who played with St Kilda and Carlton in the Australian Football League.

Sources
Holmesby, Russell & Main, Jim (2009). The Encyclopedia of AFL Footballers. 8th ed. Melbourne: Bas Publishing.

External links
 Sam Cranage at www.blueseum.org

St Kilda Football Club players
Carlton Football Club players
Greater Western Victoria Rebels players
Australian rules footballers from Victoria (Australia)
Living people
1979 births